Thomas "Scotch Tom" Nelson (1677–1747) was a businessman and politician who immigrated from England to become a merchant at Yorktown in the Colony of Virginia. He was from Penrith, Cumberland. Arriving at the beginning of the 18th century, he was the immigrant ancestor of the Nelsons, one of the First Families of Virginia.

His son William Nelson (1711–1772) inherited the family business and acquired extensive land holdings throughout the colony. He developed plantations, devoted at first to tobacco and later to mixed crops. William became a powerful politician, serving as both president of the Governor's Council and as acting governor.

William Nelson's son, Thomas Nelson Jr. (1739–1789) (grandson of "Scotch Tom"), was a signer of the Declaration of Independence, a Brigadier General during the American Revolutionary War, when he was residing at Nelson House, and a governor after statehood. Nelson County, Virginia and Thomas Nelson Community College in the Virginia Peninsula subregion of Hampton Roads are among places named in honor of Thomas Nelson Jr.

Scotch Tom's great-grandson, Hugh Nelson (1768–1836), served in the U.S. Congress. Among his other notable descendants were U.S. diplomat and noted author Thomas Nelson Page (1853–1922) and industrialist William Nelson Page (1854–1932), who co-founded the Virginian Railway with financier Henry Huttleston Rogers.  The chemist Dr. Donna J. Nelson is Scotch Tom's sixth great-granddaughter.

Thomas Nelson House    
The circa 1730 "Thomas Nelson House" was built by "Scotch Tom" Nelson in Yorktown, Virginia. His grandson Thomas Nelson Jr, a planter and politician, future governor of Virginia, was living there during the Revolutionary War.

Later the house was sold out of the Nelson family. In 1966 it was designated as a National Historical Landmark, recognized as important to colonial and US history. It was acquired in 1968 and restored in 1976 by the National Park Service to its 18th-century character. It is maintained as a contributing property of the Yorktown Battlefield, and part of the larger Colonial National Historical Park of the U.S. National Park Service.

The site of the Nelson House had originally been settled after the 1620s by immigrant Nicolas Martiau, another ancestor of Governor Thomas Nelson Jr. After being purchased in 1914 by Charles Blow and his wife, the grounds were designed by Charles F. Gillette in 1915.

References

External links 
 National Park Service official website for Nelson House at Yorktown
 Nelson House in Yorktown
 Nelson House website
 Page Nelson Society

1677 births
1747 deaths
People from Yorktown, Virginia
British emigrants to the Thirteen Colonies
Nelson family of Virginia
Virginia colonial people
People from Penrith, Cumbria
Virginia Governor's Council members